Gene Nora Stumbough Jessen (born 1937) is an American aviator and a member of Mercury 13. Jessen worked throughout her career as a flight instructor, demonstration pilot, advisor to the Federal Aviation Agency (FAA) and president of the Ninety-Nines. Jessen has also written about flying and the history of women in flight. Together with Wally Funk, Jessen is one of the last two surviving members of Mercury 13.

Biography 
Jessen grew up in Chicago. Jessen began flying while in her junior year of high school. During that time, she joined the Civil Air Patrol, where one of the students she flew with allowed her to fly the plane sometimes and told her that she was a "natural." Jessen attended Oklahoma University (OU), where she continued to fly and also played cello in the school's symphony orchestra. She was also in the school's flight club, known as the "Air Knockers." While still taking classes at OU, in 1959, Jessen became the first woman to work as a flight instructor for the school. During her time at OU, she earned seven collegiate-level flying trophies. Jessen graduated from OU in 1961. Also in 1961, Jessen was one of 13 women to go through astronaut training with the Mercury 13. Wally Funk was the person who told Jessen about the astronaut testing and soon after finding out about the program, Jessen applied with her flying credentials. She was accepted and quit her job as a flight instructor. After passing the tests, she was set to go to Florida for Navy training, but the project was cancelled.

Jessen went to work for Beechcraft in 1962 and moved to Wichita, Kansas. Jessen would pilot planes for demonstration purposes for the company. She later embarked on a 90-day cross-country flight with fellow pilot, Joyce Case, in a Beechcraft Musketeer airplane. She eventually was rated to fly the entire line of their aircraft. She met her husband, Bob Jessen, at Beechcraft and after their marriage, they moved to Boise, Idaho in 1967 where they established their own Beechcraft dealership.

Jessen was on the women's advisory committee to the Federal Aviation Agency (FAA) and had been appointed by President Lyndon B. Johnson. Between 1988 and 1990, she was President of the Ninety-Nines. In 2007, Jessen and the other Mercury 13 women received honorary doctorates at the University of Wisconsin-Oshkosh (UWO). This was the first time they had been honored as a group.

In 2017, Jessen began to experience macular degeneration in her left eye and was forced to stop flying.

Writing 
Jessen's 2018 book, Sky Girls, is a chronicle of the 1929 Powder Puff Derby. Jessen personally interviewed many of the original pilots who flew in the race. Sky Girls was previously published under the title The Powder Puff Derby of 1929. Publishers Weekly called the first version of the book a "well-wrought bit of Americana."

Selected bibliography

References

External links 
Gene Nora Jessen Recalls Astronaut Testing

People from Chicago
People from Boise, Idaho
People from Wichita, Kansas
University of Oklahoma alumni
American women aviators
Mercury 13
American flight instructors
Beechcraft
American women writers
1937 births
Living people